Imre Schlosser (also known as Imre Schlosser-Lakatos; 11 October 1889 – 18 July 1959) was a Hungarian footballer of Danube Swabian ancestry who played as a forward. He still holds the record as the highest goalscorer in the history of the Hungarian National Championship.

Club career
The son of János Schlosser and Maria Kettner, he had two brothers, (John and Joseph), who were members of the Ferencvárosi TC, and thus, he followed their footsteps and made his debut at the age of 17, on 25 February 1906, against the Postás ellen (0-1), but his game was not yet appropriate, so he returned to the second team to strengthen for 3 months. He was on the first team again in the fall and this time he showed the potential of his talent, so he soon became a regular member of the team. Schlosser played eight seasons in green and white (1906-1915), of which he was champion six times and the top goal scorer of the league six times in a row, scoring a total of 258 league goals in 155 league matches. He also won one Hungarian Cup in 1912-13, in which he scored the winning goal in the final. Remarkably, he also topped the European top scoring list four times in a row, in the 1910-11(42), 1911-12(40) and 1912-13(42) and 1913-14(36) seasons, making him the first-ever player to be Europe's top scorer four times, a record that was later equalled only by the great Josef Bican and Lionel Messi. After an argument with the FTC management team, he signed with the club's biggest rival MTK, and with them he was the champion of Hungary a further 6 times. He then spent a season at Wiener AC in Austria before returning to Ferencvárosi, to help them to a double, winning both the league and cup.
In his club career, Schlosser reportedly scored 417 league goals, a number believed to be the sixth highest of all-time in European top leagues. He managed IFK Norrköping.

International career
Schlosser made his debut for Hungary on 7 October 1906, aged 16 years and 361 days, in a 4–4 draw with Bohemia. In a national team career that would last more than 20 years, Schlosser played 68 times for Hungary (the team won 70% of the games in which they fielded Schlosser), and scored 59 goals, a ratio of 0.87 goals per match. The first of which came on 4 November 1906, aged 17 years and 24 days, in a 3–1 win over Austria. He scored 5 hat-tricks for Hungary against the likes of Austria, France, Switzerland, Germany and Russia, the most notable of which being the one against Germany, because it handed his nation a 3–1 win in the 1912 Summer Olympics – Consolation tournament semi-finals, and Hungary went on to beat Austria in the final, where Schlosser scored the opening goal in a 3–0 win.

Schlosser was the first footballer to score 50 international goals, achieving the feat when he scored a brace (two goals) in a 6–2 victory against Austria on 3 June 1917.

International

Sources:

Honours
Ferencvárosi TC
 Hungarian League: 1906–07, 1908–09, 1909–10, 1910–11, 1911–12, 1912–13, 1926–27
 Hungarian Cup: 1912–13, 1926–27

MTK Hungária FC
 Hungarian League: 1916–17, 1917–18, 1918–19, 1919–20, 1920–21, 1921–22
 Hungarian Top Scorer: 1909, 1910, 1911, 1912, 1913, 1914, 1917
 European Top Scorer: 1911, 1912, 1913, 1914

See also 
 List of men's footballers with 50 or more international goals
 List of footballers with 500 or more goals

References 

1889 births
1959 deaths
Danube-Swabian people
Hungarian people of German descent
Hungarian footballers
Hungarian expatriate football managers
MTK Budapest FC players
Ferencvárosi TC footballers
Hungary international footballers
Hungarian football managers
IFK Norrköping managers
Wisła Kraków managers
Hungarian expatriate sportspeople in Sweden
Expatriate football managers in Sweden
Hungarian expatriate sportspeople in Poland
Expatriate football managers in Poland
Association football forwards
Olympic footballers of Hungary
Footballers at the 1912 Summer Olympics
Wiener AC players
Hungarian expatriate footballers
Expatriate footballers in Austria
Expatriate football managers in Austria
Hungarian expatriate sportspeople in Austria
Footballers from Budapest